Boy Gobert (5 June 1925 – 30 May 1986) was a German film and television actor.

Partial filmography

 Island of the Dead (1955) – Schiffs-Steward
 A Heart Full of Music (1955) – Granito Bubiblanca
 My Children and I (1955) – Charlie Scheller – Manager
 Pulverschnee nach Übersee (1956) – Bob Webster
 The Model Husband (1956) – Freddy Evans
 Uns gefällt die Welt (1956) – Regisseur im Revuetheater
 Imperial and Royal Field Marshal (1956) – Manfred von Pisewitz
 Victor and Victoria (1957) – Lacoste
 Tolle Nacht (1957) – Hotelbesitzer Ernst Castell
 Dort in der Wachau (1957) – Emil Bayerl
 Love From Paris (1957) – Monpti (old)
 The Daring Swimmer (1957) – Fritz Hohebirke
  (1957) – Rombach, Kunsthändler
 Europas neue Musikparade 1958 (1957) – Karl
 A Piece of Heaven (1957) – Sir Jackie Taft-Holery
 Schwarzwälder Kirsch (1958) – Freddy Weller
  (1958) – Carl von Heymendorf – Leutnant im Regiment 'Prinz Eugen'
 Peter Voss, Thief of Millions (1958) – Ramon Cadalso
 Majestät auf Abwegen (1958) – Graf Elopatak
 Here I Am, Here I Stay (1959) – Gustave
  (1959) – Peer
 Alle lieben Peter (1959) – Bernd Werding
 The Rest Is Silence (1959) – Mike R. Krantz
 The Ideal Woman (1959) – Jaroslaw Martini
  (1959) – Eduard von Persipan, Obrist
 Paradise for Sailors (1959) – Seemann Kai Brinkmann
 Frauen in Teufels Hand (1960) – Emil
 Pension Schöller (1960) – Eugen Rümpel
 Crime Tango (1960) – Taschen-August
 You Don't Shoot at Angels (1960) – Federico
 Who Are You, Mr. Sorge? (1961) – Meissinger
 The Adventures of Count Bobby (1961) – Slippery, Gangster aus Chicago
 Junge Leute brauchen Liebe (1961) – Pierre Papillon jr.
 Die Fledermaus (1962) – Prinz Orlofsky
 The Spendthrift (1964) – Chevalier Dumont
 Le repas des fauves (1964) – Kaubach
 Emma Hamilton (1968) – Le peintre George Romney
 Shadow of Angels (1975) – Chief of Police: Mülller II
 Kamikaze 1989 (1982) – Konzernchef
 The Roaring Fifties (1983) – Udo von Gerresheim

References

External links
 

1925 births
1986 deaths
German male film actors
German male television actors
Male actors from Hamburg
20th-century German male actors